The 1939–40 Yorkshire Cup competition was a knock-out competition between (mainly professional) rugby league clubs from  the  county of Yorkshire. The actual area was at times increased to encompass other teams from  outside the  county such as Newcastle, Mansfield, Coventry, and even London (in the form of Acton & Willesden). The competition always took place early in the season, in the Autumn, with the final taking place in (or just before) December (The only exception to this was when disruption of the fixture list was caused during, and immediately after, the two World Wars, as was the case with this season)

Due to the start of the Second World War, the competition was delayed until early 1940 (see later).

1939–40 was the thirty-second occasion on which the  Yorkshire Cup competition had been held.

This season's competition is classed as a "Wartime Emergency Competition" and therefore the  results did not count as an official competition win. However, this aside, there was a new winner for this season's trophy, 
Featherstone Rovers winning the trophy by beating Wakefield Trinity by the score of 12-9

The match was played at Odsal in the City of Bradford, now in West Yorkshire. The attendance was 7,077 and receipts were £403

Unlike the  1939–40 Lancashire Cup, the  Yorkshire cup was played on a straightforward knock-out basis, and not on a two-legged basis.

Preamble to changes 
Prior to the declaration of war on 3 September 1939, most clubs had played two or three fixtures (on Saturday 26th, Thursday 31 August and Saturday 2 September).

During the following week, the Northern Rugby League decided, after publicity from the Government, to suspend the championship. They almost immediately inaugurated two regional (Lancashire and Yorkshire), Wartime Emergency Leagues, with the winner of each league meeting in a play-off final to decide the overall winner.
The Challenge Cup and both County Cups were suspended.  There was to be no Yorkshire Cup competition in 1939.

But later in the season  both County Cups were resurrected.

The Yorkshire Cup started on Saturday 25 May/1 June and was played on consecutive weekends.

Each and every match was played on a knock-out basis.

Background 
Batley, Bramley and Keighley, (the  three clubs who finishing as the bottom three in the Yorkshire League) did not appear to enter this year's competition. All had competed in the  league programme, and all competed again next season
The number of teams entering this year’s competition therefore decreased by three reducing the  total number of entrants to twelve.

This in turn resulted in four byes in the first round.

Competition and results

Round 1 
Involved  4 matches (with four byes) and 12 clubs

Round 2 - quarterfinals 
Involved 4 matches and 8 clubs

Round 3 – semifinals  
Involved 2 matches and 4 clubs

Semifinal - replays  
Involved  1 match and 2 clubs

Final

Teams and scorers 

Scoring - Try = three (3) points - Goal = two (2) points - Drop goal = two (2) points

The road to success

Notes 
1 * Batley, Bramley and Keighley, (the  three clubs who finishing as the bottom three in the Yorkshire League) did not appear to enter this year's competition

See also 
1939–40 Northern Rugby Football League Wartime Emergency League season
Rugby league county cups

References

External links
Saints Heritage Society
1896–97 Northern Rugby Football Union season at wigan.rlfans.com
Hull&Proud Fixtures & Results 1896/1897
Widnes Vikings - One team, one passion Season In Review - 1896-97
The Northern Union at warringtonwolves.org

RFL Yorkshire Cup
Yorkshire Cup